Haicang Bridge is a suspension bridge located in Xiamen, Fujian Province, China.  Built in 1999, it has a main span of 648 meters.

Haicang Bridge is a very important bridge that links Xiamen Island (where the city center is located) with the city's Haicang District located on the mainland.

Nearby Attractions
 Dong'an Tourist Area
 Bridge Museum
 Huoshao Islet Fun Island
 Youth Science Museum
 Xi'an Park
 Mt. Taiping Leisure Resort Area

See also
List of longest suspension bridge spans

External links

 

Suspension bridges in China
Bridges completed in 1999
Bridges in Fujian
Buildings and structures in Xiamen
Cross-sea bridges in China
1999 establishments in China